Rosa María Bartra Barriga (born 20 December 1973) is a Peruvian lawyer, politician and pharmaceutical chemist who served as a congresswoman for La Libertad from 2016 to 2020. She successfully ran for the post of parliamentarian in the 2016 elections with the Fujimorist party, Popular Force and in the 2020 elections with National Solidarity, failing to be elected, being invited by these two political organizations on both occasions.

Early years 
Rosa María Bartra Barriga was born on 20 December 1973 in the Huamachuco District of the homonymous city in the department of La Libertad of Peru.

References 

People from La Libertad Region
Women members of the Congress of the Republic of Peru
Living people
1973 births
Fujimorista politicians